Mesoglossus is a genus of worms belonging to the family Harrimaniidae.

Species:

Mesoglossus bournei 
Mesoglossus caraibicus 
Mesoglossus gurneyi 
Mesoglossus intermedius 
Mesoglossus macginitiei 
Mesoglossus pygmaeus

References

Enteropneusta